Yeung Po-kwan  (born 1939) is a school principal and politician in Hong Kong.

He studied at the Ying Wa College and Diocesan Boys' School and attended the University of Hong Kong. He later received the Diploma of Education and the Certificate in Educational Management and Administration from the Chinese University of Hong Kong and Moray House College of Education in at the University of Edinburgh respectively. He was the principal of the Kung Lee College, Ming Yin College and Ying Wa College from 1990 to 2003.

He is also the Incorporated Phonographic Society, British Institute of Management and Royal Society of Arts and the member of the Institute of Linguists.

Yeung was appointed to the Legislative Council in 1983 by Governor Edward Youde.

References

1939 births
Living people
Hong Kong Christians
Hong Kong educators
Officers of the Order of the British Empire
Recipients of the Colonial Police Medal
Alumni of the University of Hong Kong
Alumni of the Chinese University of Hong Kong
Alumni of the University of Edinburgh
HK LegCo Members 1985–1988